Petar Popović may refer to:
 Petar Popović (architect) (1873–1945), Serbian architect
 Petar Popović (basketball, born 1959), Croatian former basketball player, father of Marko Popović
 Petar Popović (basketball, born 1979), Serbian professional basketball player
 Petar Popović (basketball, born 1996), Montenegrin professional basketball player
 Petar Popović (chess player) (born 1959), Serbian chess Grandmaster
 Petar Popović (tennis) (born 1982), coach of Andrea Petkovic
 Pecija (Petar Popović, 1826–1875), Serbian rebel leader from Bosanska Krajina
 Petar Popović (poet) (1904–1995), Serbian poet and Surrealist